The 1932 Tour of Flanders was held in 1932.

General classification

Final general classification

References
Résultats sur siteducyclisme.net
Résultats sur cyclebase.nl

External links
 

Tour of Flanders
1932 in road cycling
1932 in Belgian sport